Lages is a Brazilian municipality located in the central part of the state of Santa Catarina, in the region known in Portuguese as "Planalto Serrano".

It is located in the mountain region of the state and is the largest municipality of it. It is the main city of this region, and borders the towns of Otacílio Costa, São Joaquim, and Correia Pinto. The main course of urban water is Carahá River.

Lages hosts an annual festival called Festa do Pinhão, that is famous throughout the country.

Economically, the city is known for its strong cattle breeding and wood processing factories.

History
In the beginning of the 17th century, the arrival of the first Europeans established the town. The growing of the Campos de Lajens was due to the opening of roads to reach the fields of the state Rio Grande do Sul. The people of São Paulo and Minas Gerais were attracted to this region due to the cattle-breeding business with the gauchos.

Very primitive documents mention Lajens as a stop for horse riders that were traveling from Sorocaba or São Paulo, transporting mules, horses and cattle. Correia Pinto, the founder, was a horse rider, and ran cattle groups from Lajens to São Paulo.

On November 22, 1766, Lajens was promoted to state from village. In 1820 it detached itself from São Paulo to be part of the state of Santa Catarina. On May 25, 1860, it was elevated to city status. In 1960 the city's name was changed to Lages with a "g" wrongly inserted.

During the Revolução Farroupilha, Lages belonged to the state of Rio Grande do Sul.

Lages is served by Antônio Correia Pinto de Macedo Airport and Planalto Serrano Regional Airport located in the adjoining municipality of Correia Pinto.

Geography
Lages is located in the mountain region of the state and is the largest municipality of it. It is the main city of this region, and borders the towns of Otacílio Costa, São Joaquim, and Correia Pinto. The main course of urban water is Carahá River.

Climate
Winter temperatures can stay below freezing, with occurrence of frost and snow. During the summer, temperatures may reach  and droughts may occur.

Records

With , August 1983 was the month with  the most accumulated precipitation. The lowest relative humidity observed was of 20% on 13 November 1971.

Neighborhoods 
Lages contains seventy-two neighborhoods:

 Araucária
 Área Industrial
 Bates
 Beatriz
 Bela Vista
 Bom Jesus
 Boqueirão
 Brusque
 Caça e Tiro
 Caravágio
 Caroba
 CDL
 Centenário
 Centro
 Cidade Alta
 Chapada
 Conta Dinheiro
 Copacabana
 Coral
 Conte
 Cruz de Malta
 Dom Daniel
 Ferrovia
 Frei Rogério
 Gethal
 Gralha Azul
 Guadalupe
 Guadalajara
 Guarujá
 Golin
 Habitação
 Ipiranga
 Jardim Celina
 Jardim das Camélias
 Jardim Panorâmico
 Maria Luiza
 Morro do Posto
 Morro Grande
 Nossa Senhora Aparecida
 Passo Fundo
 Penha
 Petrópolis
 Pisani
 Ponte Grande(Jardim Cepar)(Avenida Corina Caon)
 Popular
 Pró-Morar
 Restinga Seca
 Sagrado Coração de Jesus
 Santa Catarina
 Santa Cândida
 Santa Clara
 Santa Helena
 Santa Maria
 Santa Mônica
 Santa Rita
 Santo Antônio
 São Cristóvão
 São Francisco
 Salto Caveiras
 São Luiz
 São Miguel
 São Paulo
 São Pedro
 São Sebastião
 Triângulo
 Tributo
 Universitário
 Várzea
 Vila Comboni
 Vila Maria
 Vila Mariza
 Vila Nova
 Vista Alegre

Gallery

References

External links
 Lages City Hall
 Festa do Pinhão official site

 
Municipalities in Santa Catarina (state)